Betty Ballantine (born Elizabeth Jones; September 25, 1919 – February 12, 2019) was an American publisher, editor, and writer.  She was born during the Raj to a British colonial family. After her marriage to Ian Ballantine in 1939, she moved to New York where they created Bantam Books in 1945 and established Ballantine Books in 1952. They became freelance publishers in the 1970s. Their son, Richard, was an author and journalist specializing in cycling topics.

Company
Ian and Betty Ballantine won one special World Fantasy Award for professional work in 1975 and another one shared with Joy Chant and other creators of The High Kings (Bantam, 1983), a reference book on the Matter of Britain that incorporates retellings. (It was also a runner-up in nonfiction Hugo and Locus Award categories.) Betty Ballantine received a Special Committee Award from the annual World Science Fiction Convention in 2006 and a World Fantasy Award for Life Achievement from the World Fantasy Convention in 2007. The Ballantines were both inducted by the Science Fiction Hall of Fame in 2008, with a shared citation.

Publication
Ballantine wrote the novel The Secret Oceans published by Bantam in 1994 with illustrations by twelve artists.

See also

References

Further reading
Silver, Steven H. "An Award Well Deserved". Argentus, 2005, p. 5.

External links
  — identical to its 
 
 Betty Ballantine at Feminist SF 
 "Couples Who Mastered Publishing, No. 2: The Ballantines" by Frederik Pohl, March 15, 2011
 "Publishing legend Betty Ballantine dies in Bearsville at 99" from Hudson Valley One, February 18, 2019

 

1919 births
2019 deaths
American paperback book publishers (people)
Science fiction editors
Science Fiction Hall of Fame inductees
British people in colonial India
British emigrants to the United States
Ballantine family
Women speculative fiction editors